Catshead may refer to:

Catshead (architecture), a roof extension on mills or barns
Catshead (apple), a cultivar of cooking apples
Catshead, an alternate name for the Pseudagrion coeleste species of damselfly